Quantum weirdness encompasses the aspects of quantum mechanics that challenge and defy human physical intuition based on the Newtonian mechanics of classical physics. These aspects include:
 quantum entanglement;
 quantum nonlocality, referred to by Einstein as "spooky action at a distance"; see also EPR paradox;
 quantum superposition, presented in dramatic form in the thought experiment known as Schrödinger's cat;
 the uncertainty principle;
 wave-particle duality;
 the probabilistic nature of wave function collapse, decried by Einstein, saying, "God does not play dice".

Many attempts have been made to construct an interpretation of quantum mechanics assigning a meaning to the laws of quantum mechanics in terms of an intuitively acceptable model. The so-called Copenhagen interpretation basically holds that the laws are as they are and need no interpretation in such a model.

See also
 Bell's theorem
 Renninger negative-result experiment
 Wheeler's delayed-choice experiment

References
 

Quantum mechanics